Eurystomellidae is a family of bryozoans belonging to the order Cheilostomatida.

Genera:
 Eurystomella Levinsen, 1909
 Integripelta Gordon, Mawatari & Kajihara, 2002
 Selenariopsis Maplestone, 1913
 Zygopalme Gordon, Mawatari & Kajihara, 2002

References

Cheilostomatida